Gardelegen is a town in Saxony-Anhalt, Germany. It is situated on the right bank of the Milde, 20 m. W. from Stendal, on the main line of railway Berlin-Hanover.

History
Gardelegen has a Roman Catholic and three Evangelical churches, a hospital, founded in 1285, and a high-grade school. There are considerable manufactures, notably agricultural machinery and buttons, and its beer has a great reputation.

Gardelegen was founded in the 10th century (first named 1196). The castle Isenschnibbe was owned by the House of Alvensleben from 1378 until 1857. On the neighboring heath Margrave Louis I. of Brandenburg gained, in 1343, a victory over Otto the Mild of Brunswick. In 1358 Gardelegen became a city of the Hanse. It suffered considerably in the Thirty Years' War, and in 1757 barely avoided being burned by the French. On 15 March 1945, 52 people lost their lives during an air raid, and on 13 April 1945, it was the site of a massacre of slave laborers, perpetrated by local civilians and the SS. The site of the massacre is now a memorial.

At the height of the Cold war, a USAF RB-66 reconnaissance aircraft was shot down by Soviet fighters near the town on 10 March 1964. The aircraft's crew bailed out and was rescued and eventually handed back to West Berlin by Soviet forces.

After having incorporated 5 former municipalities in 2009, 6 in 2010, and 18 in 2011, Gardelegen is now Germany's third largest city by area, trailing only Berlin and Hamburg. It is actually the largest municipality in area in what was formerly East Germany. The population however is small, with only about 22,000.

Geography 
The town Gardelegen consists of Gardelegen proper and the following Ortschaften or municipal divisions:

Algenstedt
Berge
Breitenfeld
Dannefeld
Estedt
Hemstedt
Hottendorf
Jeggau
Jeseritz
Kloster Neuendorf
Köckte
Letzlingen
Lindstedt
Mieste
Miesterhorst
Peckfitz
Potzehne
Roxförde
Sachau
Schenkenhorst
Seethen
Sichau
Solpke
Wannefeld
Wiepke
Zichtau

Furthermore, the town Gardelegen contains the localities Ipse, Jävenitz, Jerchel, Kassieck, Lindenthal, Trüstedt, Weteritz, Zienau and Ziepel.

Sights
There are various well-preserved half-timbered houses in Main Street (Ernst-Thälmann-Straße) and Nicolaistraße as well as a part of the medieval city wall which deserve a visit. In the northern part of the historical centre, St. Georg is a sightworthy gothic chapel which was mentioned for the first time in 1362 as a part of a hospital. It was renovated and enlarged in 1734, and today it is used for exhibitions and concerts. In the Middle Ages, the hospital was outside the town, which was surrounded by moats and walls, as people with infectious diseases were treated there. Originally, Gardelegen had three gates when it was surrounded by a medieval town wall. Salzwedel Gate dating from 1565 is a well-preserved gate in the north, a part of Stendal Gate is left in the southeast but Magdeburg Gate in the southwest was demolished completely.

St. Nicolai Church dating from the 14th century was heavily damaged by bombs on 15 March 1945. The nave is still in ruins, and the tower was renovated. There are plans to transform the nave into a concert hall. St. Spiritus is a renaissance building dating from 1591 which belonged to a monastery that was mentioned for the first time in 1319. It was a hospital where sick and elderly people were looked after. St. Mary's Church was built around 1200 in a romantic style with five naves and enlarged in the 14th century, and the Town Hall is an impressive baroque structure which was built from 1526-1522.

Gallery

Twin towns – sister cities

Gardelegen is twinned with:
 Darłowo, Poland
 Gifhorn, Germany
 Waltrop, Germany

Notable people

Christian Francken (1550–1611), Jesuit and Unitarian theologian
Joachim Lange (1670–1744), theologian
Johann Wilhelm Weinmann (1683–1741), chemist and botanist
Christoph August Tiedge (1752–1841), poet
Otto Reutter (1870–1931), comedian, singer and actor
Werner Preuss (1884–1919), officer
Christa Stubnick (1933–2021), sprinter
Raymond Hecht (born 1968), javelin thrower

Associated with the town
Richard Sonnenfeldt (1923–2009), American engineer and author, grew up in Gardelegen
Helmut Sonnenfeldt (1926–2012), American government official, grew up in Gardelegen

References

External links
 

 
Towns in Saxony-Anhalt
Altmarkkreis Salzwedel
Members of the Hanseatic League